The Soledad Brothers were three inmates charged with the murder of a prison guard, John Vincent Mills, at California's Soledad Prison on January 16, 1970. George Jackson, Fleeta Drumgo, and John Clutchette were alleged to have murdered Mills in retaliation for the shooting deaths of three black prisoners during a prison fight in the exercise yard three days prior by another guard, Opie G. Miller. Clutchette and Drumgo were acquitted by a jury while Jackson was killed in a prison riot prior to trial.

Soledad Prison
George Jackson met W. L. Nolen through the Black Panther Party in Soledad State Prison in 1969. They were transferred together, along with Drumgo and Clutchette, to the O Wing, which was considered the worst part of the adjustment center of which Max Row is a part. According to Jackson, in the O Wing "the strongest hold out no more than a couple of weeks. It destroys the logical processes of the mind, a man's thoughts become completely disorganized. The noise, madness streaming from every throat, frustrated sounds from the bars, metallic sounds from the walls, the steel trays, the iron beds bolted to the wall, the hollow sounds from a cast-iron sink or toilet. The smells, the human waste thrown at us, unwashed bodies, the rotten food. When a white con leaves here he's ruined for life. No black leaves Max Row walking. Either he leaves on the meat wagon or he leaves crawling licking at the pig's feet."

In Jackson's letters from the prison he describes the attitude of the staff toward the convicts as both defensive and hostile, apparently out of pure malevolence. His account of life at the prison was used by the Soledad Brothers Defense Committee.

Prison yard riot
On January 13, 1970, 14 black inmates and 2 white inmates from the maximum-security section of Soledad Prison were released into a recreation yard. It had been several months since they were last released into the yard. The black prisoners were ordered to the far end of the yard, while the white prisoners remained near the center of the yard. A fist fight ensued and Miller opened fire on the prisoners below. No warning shot was fired. Three black inmates were killed in the shooting: W.L. Nolen and Cleveland Edwards died in the yard, while Alvin Miller died in the prison hospital a few hours later. A white inmate, Billy D. Harris, was wounded in the groin by Miller's fourth shot, and ended up losing a testicle. In a letter from June 10, 1970, George Jackson described the scene as seeing three of his brothers having been "murdered [...] by a pig shooting from 30 feet above their heads with a military rifle."

Following the incident, thirteen black prisoners began a hunger strike in the hopes of securing an investigation. On January 16, 1970, a Monterey County grand jury convened, then exonerated Miller in the deaths of Nolen, Edwards, and Miller with a ruling of "justifiable homicide". No black inmates were permitted to testify, including those who had been in the recreation yard during the shooting. In Soledad Prison, inmates heard the grand jury's ruling on the prison radio. Thirty minutes later, prison guard officer John V. Mills was found dying in another maximum-security wing of the prison, having been beaten and thrown from a third-floor tier of Y Wing, George Jackson's cellblock, to the television room below. On February 14, 1970, after an investigation into Mills' death by prison officials, George Lester Jackson, Fleeta Drumgo and John Wesley Clutchette were indicted by the Monterey County grand jury for first-degree murder.

Soledad Brothers Defense Committee

The Soledad Brothers Defense Committee was formed by Fay Stender to assist in publicizing the case and raising funds to defend Jackson, Drumgo, and Clutchette. Among the several celebrities, writers, and left-wing political activists that supported the SBDC and their cause were Julian Bond, Kay Boyle, Marlon Brando, Jane Fonda, Noam Chomsky, Lawrence Ferlinghetti, Allen Ginsberg, Tom Hayden, William Kunstler, Jessica Mitford, Linus Pauling, Pete Seeger, Benjamin Spock, and Angela Davis. In June 1970, California State Senator Mervyn Dymally and the California Legislative Black Caucus pursued an investigation of Soledad Prison and released a report that tried to legitimize the committee and give it some credibility. Public reaction was mixed. By the middle of that month, Davis was leading the movement. Stender also arranged the publication of Soledad Brother: The Prison Letters of George Jackson, which was to contain various letters written by Jackson while in prison detailing his time spent in the prison throughout the trial.

Jonathan Jackson's attempt to free the Soledad Brothers

On August 7, 1970, George Jackson's seventeen-year-old brother Jonathan held up a courtroom during the trial of prisoner James McClain, charged at the time with the attempted stabbing of a Soledad guard at the Marin County Civic Center. Jonathan Jackson, after having armed McClain, temporarily freed three San Quentin prisoners, and took Superior Court Judge Harold Haley, Deputy District Attorney Gary Thomas, and three women on the jury hostage to secure the freedom of the "Soledad Brothers". Jackson, McClain, Haley, and a prisoner named William Christmas were killed as they attempted to drive away from the courthouse. Haley died due to the discharge of a sawed-off shotgun that had been fastened to his neck with adhesive tape by the abductors. Thomas, prisoner Ruchell Magee, and one of the jurors were wounded. Two days after his brother's death, in George Jackson's last letter in his collection of letters written while in prison, he wrote a letter to his deceased brother, signing it:

Cold and calm though.'All right, gentlemen, I'm taking over now.' Revolution, George"

Angela Davis, who purchased the guns used in the escape attempt, was later tried on several charges in connection with the escape. A jury found her not guilty on murder, kidnapping, and criminal conspiracy charges.

San Quentin Six

On August 21, 1971, days before his trial in the guard's killing, the 29-year-old Jackson allegedly launched a riot at San Quentin with a 9 mm pistol. There is controversy over the course of events that led to Jackson's obtaining of the firearm. Prison officials alleged that Stephen Bingham, the attorney who replaced Fay Stender as Jackson's attorney, visited Jackson. Bingham was alleged to have smuggled Jackson a pistol and an Afro wig. He was purported to have given a wig to Jackson within in which to hide the gun. However, Bingham was found not guilty of this charge in an ensuing trial in 1986. Prison officials had claimed that as Jackson was attempting to leave his meeting with Bingham, a gun protruded from a wig he was wearing and Jackson was asked to show the object. With a gun in hand, Jackson released an entire floor of prisoners from the maximum-security wing, allegedly saying, "This is it, gentlemen, the Dragon has come!" In the ensuing melee, three guards were killed, as were two prisoners suspected of being snitches, before George Jackson rushed out into the yard where he was shot and killed by a guard. Other people involved in the case believe Jackson's death was a setup by prison authorities, who conspired to supply Jackson with a gun, in the hopes that he would be killed in the ensuing melee, allegedly because they saw his power as a threat to their control and authority. Inconsistencies in the stories, although common among eyewitnesses in many crimes, fueled the controversy and helped to set off an uprising at Attica Correctional Facility in New York three weeks later. Bingham's acquittal in 1986 on charges that he smuggled Jackson a gun and a wig, and was thereby responsible for the escape attempt and murders, occurred after he emerged from hiding for 13 years in order to stand trial.

Trial
In San Francisco, proceedings were held in the Department 21 courtroom on the third floor of the Hall of Justice, the same courtroom in which Ruchell Magee would later be tried on charges related to the murder of Judge Haley. Spectators, including the press, were separated from the proceedings by a $15,000 floor-to-ceiling barrier constructed of metal, wood, and bullet-proof glass. Throughout the trial, there were attempts to annul the proceedings on technicalities. There were complaints on behalf of the defendants that they were not informed of the scheduled court hearing, specifically in a letter from George Jackson on June 13, 1970. They also claimed the court report stated that 1-48 pages of the testimony were recorded and they were only given 1-46 pages of testimony. After Jackson's death, on March 27, 1972, the two surviving Soledad Brothers—Clutchette and Drumgo—were acquitted by a San Francisco jury of the original charges of murdering a prison guard on the grounds that the state had failed to completely prove its case.

Notes

References

Further reading
 Soledad Brother: The Prison Letters of George Jackson (1970). 
 Min S Yee. The Melancholy History of Soledad Prison; In Which a Utopian Scheme Turns Bedlam (1973). 

1970s in the United States
Quantified groups of defendants
Prisoners and detainees of California
20th-century American trials
Prison writings